In mathematics, a magic cube is the 3-dimensional equivalent of a magic square, that is, a collection of integers arranged in an n × n × n pattern such that the sums of the numbers on each row, on each column, on each pillar and on each of the four main space diagonals are equal, the so-called magic constant of the cube, denoted M3(n). It can be shown that if a magic cube consists of the numbers 1, 2, ..., n3, then it has magic constant 

If, in addition, the numbers on every cross section diagonal also sum up to the cube's magic number, the cube is called a perfect magic cube; otherwise, it is called a semiperfect magic cube. The number n is called the order of the magic cube. If the sums of numbers on a magic cube's broken space diagonals also equal the cube's magic number, the cube is called a pandiagonal magic cube.

Alternative definition
In recent years, an alternative definition for the perfect magic cube has gradually come into use. It is based on the fact that a pandiagonal magic square has traditionally been called "perfect", because all possible lines sum correctly. That is not the case with the above definition for the cube.

Multimagic cubes

As in the case of magic squares, a bimagic cube has the additional property of remaining a magic cube when all of the entries are squared, a trimagic cube remains a magic cube under both the operations of squaring the entries and of cubing the entries.  (Only two of these are known, as of 2005.)  A tetramagic cube remains a magic cube when the entries are squared, cubed, or raised to the fourth power.

Magic cubes based on Dürer's and Gaudi Magic squares
A magic cube can be built with the constraint of a given magic square appearing on one of its faces Magic cube with the magic square of Dürer, and Magic cube with the magic square of Gaudi

See also
 Perfect magic cube
 Semiperfect magic cube
 Multimagic cube
 Magic hypercube
 Magic cube classes
 Magic series
 Nasik magic hypercube
 John R. Hendricks

References

External links
 Harvey Heinz, All about Magic Cubes
 Marian Trenkler, Magic p-dimensional cubes
 Marian Trenkler, An algorithm for making magic cubes
 Marian Trenkler, On additive and multiplicative magic cubes
 Ali Skalli's magic squares and magic cubes

Magic squares